Lars William Karlsson (born 8 January 1993), nicknamed "Wild Bill", is a Swedish professional ice hockey forward for the Vegas Golden Knights of the National Hockey League (NHL). He was drafted in the second round, 53rd overall, by the Anaheim Ducks in the 2011 NHL Entry Draft. In addition to playing for Vegas, Karlsson has also played in the NHL for Anaheim and the Columbus Blue Jackets.

After being selected by the Golden Knights in the 2017 NHL Expansion Draft, Karlsson has been one of the key points of the team offense, and helped Vegas reach Stanley Cup Finals in their inaugural season. During his first season in Vegas, Karlsson scored a career-high 43 goals and became the franchise all-time leader in goals.

Playing career

Sweden
In the 2011–12 season, Karlsson finished in 12th place in Allsvenskan scoring after recording 45 points in 46 games, the second-most on his team. He made his senior Elitserien debut with HV71.

Anaheim Ducks and Columbus Blue Jackets
On 20 May 2013, Karlsson signed a three-year, entry-level contract with the NHL's Anaheim Ducks, the team that drafted him in the second round, 53rd overall, in the 2011 NHL Entry Draft. He was returned on loan to HV71 for the 2013–14 season.

Karlsson made his NHL debut on 11 October 2014 and scored his first and second NHL goals on 13 October against Michal Neuvirth of the Buffalo Sabres. He was reassigned to Anaheim's American Hockey League (AHL) affiliate, the Norfolk Admirals, on 24 November. Karlsson was reassigned between Norfolk and Anaheim for the remainder of the season, but finished the year in the AHL.

On 2 March 2015, Karlsson was traded to the Columbus Blue Jackets (along with Rene Bourque and a second-round draft pick in 2015) in exchange for James Wisniewski and a third-round pick in 2015.

Vegas Golden Knights
On 21 June 2017, having been left "exposed" by Columbus for the 2017 NHL Expansion Draft, Karlsson was selected by the first year expansion team Vegas Golden Knights. The Blue Jackets traded a first-round pick, a second-round pick in 2019 and injured forward David Clarkson to Vegas with the agreement that the Golden Knights would select Karlsson.

Karlsson spent the 2017–18 season (Vegas' first in the NHL) centering a line with Reilly Smith and Jonathan Marchessault. This proved to be a productive line, with all three putting up career-high offensive numbers. Karlsson scored his first career NHL hat-trick on 31 December 2017 against the Toronto Maple Leafs, it also being the first hat-trick in Golden Knights history. He scored his second career NHL hat-trick on 18 March 2018 against the Calgary Flames. In addition to providing 35 assists and an NHL-high plus-minus rating of +45, Karlsson ended the regular season with 43 goals, setting a new NHL record for goals scored by a player in an expansion team's inaugural season. His 43 goals placed him third in NHL scoring, behind Patrik Laine (44) and Alexander Ovechkin (49). Karlsson was also named a finalist for the Lady Byng Memorial Trophy for his high standard of play and sportsmanship. On 20 June, he was named the recipient of the trophy, becoming the first player since Wayne Gretzky to win an end-of-season award in their team's inaugural season in the NHL. Karlsson was also awarded the Guldpucken as the top Swedish ice hockey player in the 2017–18 season.

After his career-high season, on 4 August 2018, Karlsson signed a new one-year, $5.25 million contract with Vegas for the 2018–19 season. Karlsson described his decision to sign a one-year contract as "betting on [him]self a little" and that he would use the subsequent season to prove that his 2018–19 production "was no fluke".

On 24 June 2019, having produced 24 goals and 32 assists (56 points) in the 2018–19 season, Karlsson signed a new eight-year, $47.2 million contract with Vegas worth an average annual value of $5.9 million. The contract is effective from the 2019–20 season through to the end of the 2026–27 season.

Personal life
Karlsson is an open AIK supporter. As a child, his biggest dream was to play for AIK Football.

In 2020, Karlsson became engaged to former The Bachelor contestant Emily Ferguson. They married on July 23, 2022 .

Career statistics

Regular season and playoffs

International

Awards and honours

Records
 Holds the NHL record for most goals scored (43) by a single player in an expansion team's inaugural season (previously Brian Bradley with Tampa Bay (42) from 1993–2018).

References

External links

1993 births
Living people
Anaheim Ducks draft picks
Anaheim Ducks players
Columbus Blue Jackets players
HV71 players
Lady Byng Memorial Trophy winners
Norfolk Admirals players
People from Sigtuna Municipality
Springfield Falcons players
Swedish expatriate ice hockey players in the United States
Swedish ice hockey centres
Vegas Golden Knights players
VIK Västerås HK players
Sportspeople from Stockholm County